Darreh Khar Zahreh or Darreh Kharzahreh may refer to:
 Darreh Khar Zahreh, Khuzestan
 Darreh Kharzahreh, Kohgiluyeh and Boyer-Ahmad